Shartaq may refer to:
 Shartaq 1
 Shartaq 2